is a Japanese manga artist and the creator of the series One Piece (1997–present). With more than 516.6 million tankōbon copies in circulation worldwide, One Piece is both the best-selling manga in history and the best-selling comic series printed in volume, in turn making Oda one of the best-selling fiction authors. The series' popularity resulted in Oda being named one of the manga artists that changed the history of manga.

Early life 
Eiichiro Oda was born on January 1, 1975, in Kumamoto, Japan. He said that at the age of four he resolved to become a manga artist in order to avoid having to get a "real job". His biggest influence is Akira Toriyama and his series Dragon Ball. He recalls that his interest in pirates was probably sparked by the popular TV animation series titled Vicky the Viking. He submitted a character named Pandaman for Yudetamago's classic wrestling manga Kinnikuman. Pandaman was not only used in a chapter of the manga but would later return as a recurring cameo character in Oda's own works.

Career 
At the age of 17, Oda submitted his work Wanted! and won several awards, including second place in the coveted Tezuka Award. That got him into a job at the Weekly Shōnen Jump magazine, where he originally worked as assistant manga artist/assistant to Shinobu Kaitani's series Suizan Police Gang before moving to Masaya Tokuhiro on Jungle King Tar-chan and Mizu no Tomodachi Kappaman, which gave him an unexpected influence on his artistic style. At the age of 19, he began working as an assistant to Nobuhiro Watsuki on Rurouni Kenshin, before winning the Hop Step Award for new manga artists. Watsuki credits Oda for helping create the character Honjō Kamatari who appears in Rurouni Kenshin.

During this time, Oda drew two pirate-themed one-shot stories called "Romance Dawn", which were published in Akamaru Jump and Weekly Shōnen Jump respectively in late 1996. "Romance Dawn" featured Monkey D. Luffy as the protagonist, who then became the protagonist of One Piece.

In 1997, One Piece began serialization in Weekly Shōnen Jump and has become not only one of the most popular manga in Japan, but the best-selling manga series of all time. It sold 100 million collected tankōbon volumes by February 2005, over 200 million by February 2011, had 320,866,000 copies printed worldwide by December 2014, 430 million volumes in circulation worldwide as of October 2017, 440million copies sold as of May 2018 and 450million in print as of March 2019.

Additionally, individual volumes of One Piece have broken publishing records in Japan. Volume 56 received the highest initial print run of any manga, 2.85 million copies, in 2009. Volume 57's print of 3 million in 2010 was the highest first print for any book in Japan, not just manga. A record that was broken several times by subsequent volumes and currently held by 67's 4.05 million initial printing in 2012. In 2013, the series won the 41st Japan Cartoonists Association Award Grand Prize, alongside Kimuchi Yokoyama's Nekodarake Nice.

In a 2008 poll, conducted by marketing research firm Oricon, Oda was elected fifth most favorite manga artists of Japan. He shared the place with Yoshihiro Togashi, creator of YuYu Hakusho and Hunter × Hunter. In their 2010 poll on the Mangaka that Changed the History of Manga, Oda came in fourth.

For the tenth One Piece animated theatrical film, Strong World, Oda created the film's story, drew over 120 drawings for guidance and insisted Mr. Children provide the theme song. Additionally, a special chapter of the manga was created and included in tankōbon volume 0, which was given free to attendees of the film and also contained his drawings for the film. Following the particular success of the this film, Oda also provided the character design for and executive produced the subsequent movies Z (2012), Gold (2016), Stampede (2019), and Red (2022).

Oda and Akira Toriyama created a 2007 crossover one-shot called Cross Epoch, that contains characters from Toriyama's Dragon Ball and Oda's One Piece. In 2013, they each designed a Gaist character for the video game Gaist Crusher.

Personal life 
Oda regarded many mangaka both as his friend and rival. Among these were his fellow assistants under Nobuhiro Watsuki; Hiroyuki Takei, and Mikio Itō. Still many years later, they remained good friends. Another mangaka is Masashi Kishimoto. For the title page illustration of One Piece chapter 766, which ran in 2014's 50th issue of Weekly Shōnen Jump alongside the final two chapters of Kishimoto's Naruto, Oda included a hidden message and other tributes in the art. Kishimoto himself also gave tribute in the ending of Naruto where the character Boruto Uzumaki makes a drawing of the Straw Hat Jolly Roger on a mountain. Upon the release of Chapter 1,000 of One Piece, several of Oda's fellow mangaka rivals paid tribute in the author's comment section of Weekly Shōnen Jump by congratulating Oda for achieving this milestone.

According to Oda himself and his manga editors, he is an ardent worker, perfectionist, and sleeps only three hours per day during a typical work week.

He was hospitalized for a peritonsillar abscess in 2013 and later discharged from the hospital after two weeks. After a year, he underwent a tonsillectomy to completely cure his condition.

Oda gifted Kumamoto Prefecture 800 million yen (US$8 million 4.9 million Pounds UK) in 2018 after it suffered a damaging earthquake in 2016 that had affected its iconic Kumamoto Castle. Oda's 800 million yen donation was offered in two separate gifts, one for 500 million yen under Luffy's name and a second donation of 300 million yen. Eiichiro Oda has long been a supporter of earthquake-stricken areas, writing supportive messages, contributing art for local products, and participating in the ONE PIECE Kumamoto Revival Project.

Awards 
Eiichiro Oda has received several awards and titles. His Awards lists:
 Second half of 1992: second place Tezuka Award for Wanted!
 1993: Hop☆Step Award for Ikki Yakō
 2000: Tezuka Osamu Cultural Prize finalist for One Piece
 2001: Tezuka Osamu Cultural Prize finalist for One Piece
 2002: Tezuka Osamu Cultural Prize finalist for One Piece
 2005: Sondermann Award in the International Manga category for One Piece
 2006: Japanese Media Arts Festival 100 Manga Selection for One Piece
 2008: Sondermann Award in the International Manga category for Volume 44 of One Piece
 2009: Sondermann Award in the International Manga category for Volume 48 of One Piece
 2012: Received Grand Prize at 41st Japan Cartoonists Association Award for One Piece
 2015: Guinness World Record for "the most copies published for the same comic book series by a single author" with 320,866,000 copies printed worldwide up until December 2014.
 2018: Kumamoto Prefecture Honorary Prize 
 2019: Most Searched Author at The Yahoo! Japan Search Awards 
 2019: Included in the list of Newsweek Japan'''s "100 Globally respected Japanese people."
 2022: Special Lifetime Achievement Award at Napoli Comicon 2022 in Italy.
 2022: Guinness World Record for "the most copies published for the same comic book series by a single author" with 516,566,000 copies in printed worldwide up until July 2022.

 2023: 18th Shin Watanabe Award, an award for a producer or creator who has created a major movement in the entertainment business and made a significant contribution to the development of popular entertainment culture.

 Works 
 Manga 
 Wanted! (1992)
 
 
 Monsters (1994)
 Romance Dawn (first version, 1996)
 Romance Dawn (second version, 1996)
 One Piece (1997–present)
 
 Wanted! (1992)
 God's Present for the Future Ikki Yakō Monsters Romance Dawn (second version)
 Cross Epoch (2007) – crossover between Dragon Ball and One Piece with Akira Toriyama
  – crossover between Toriko and One Piece with Mitsutoshi Shimabukuro

 Art books 
 One Piece Color Walk 1 One Piece Color Walk 2 One Piece Color Walk 3 Lion One Piece Color Walk 4 Eagle One Piece Color Walk 5 Shark One Piece Color Walk 6 Gorilla One Piece Color Walk 7 Tyrannosaurus One Piece Color Walk 8 Wolf One Piece Color Walk 9 Tiger Film 
 One Piece Film: Strong World (2009) – costume design, creature design, story and executive producer
 One Piece Film: Z (2012) – character design, costume design and executive producer
 One Piece Film: Gold (2016) – character design (Straw Hat costume design, Carina, Tesoro, Dice and Baccarat character design) and executive producer
 One Piece: Stampede (2019) – character design, costume design, creative supervisor and executive producer
 One Piece Film: Red (2022) – executive producer, character design, and script reviewer

 Other 
 Designed a line of luxury goods, known as the "Sleeping Mermaid Collection", in a collaboration with the French luxury manufacturer S.T. Dupont. While the project is unrelated to One Piece the expensive lighter from the set eventually made two very bold cameos in One Piece Film Z and even in the manga itself.
 Drew an illustration for Chibi Maruko-chan Manga Creator Momoko Sakura after her death. The illustration showed Luffy sharing barbecue with Maruko-chan with  accompanying message that the two authors got along well in both their professional and personal lives and that he is praying for Sakura.
 Collaborated with fashion brand, Gucci and created a Lookbook featured both Monkey D. Luffy and Roronoa Zoro sporting poses with a series of images of the two rocking the latest Gucci line. 
 Drew Original Illustration for the President and all One Piece fans in France.
 Drew Original Illustration for sport "Karate" for the Olympic Games Tokyo 2020 Official Programme book which highlights the defining traits, history, rules, top athletes, venue, schedule, and the major tournament records for each of the 33 featured sports.
 One of the executive producers for the ordered One Piece live-action series by Netflix and Tomorrow Studios.
 Designed a new character and monsters for the 2022 role-playing video game One Piece Odyssey''.

References

External links 

 

1975 births
Living people
Manga artists from Kumamoto Prefecture
Japanese illustrators
One Piece
People from Kumamoto